The 1940 South American Basketball Championship was the 8th edition of this tournament. It was held in Montevideo, Uruguay and won by the host, Uruguay national basketball team. A record 6 teams competed, including Paraguay in their first appearance, despite the World War that was currently under way.

Final rankings

Results

Each team played the other five teams once, for a total of five games played by each team and 15 overall in the tournament.

External links

FIBA.com archive for SAC1940

1940
S
B
Champ
Sports competitions in Montevideo
1940s in Montevideo
1940 in Uruguayan sport
January 1940 sports events